Will Milner (born 28 October 1994) is a professional rugby union player who plays for Huddersfield in National League 2 North.  

Milner has previously spent time on loan at the Keighley Cougars in Kingstone Press League 1 and signed a two year contract in October 2016.  The contract was cancelled by mutual consent in August 2017.

He has previously played for Featherstone Rovers in the Kingstone Press Championship.

References

External links
Featherstone Rovers profile

1994 births
Living people
English rugby league players
English rugby union players
Featherstone Rovers players
Huddersfield R.U.F.C. players
Keighley Cougars players
Rugby league five-eighths
Rugby league halfbacks
Rugby league players from Yorkshire
Rugby union players from Yorkshire